Jacob Jackson may refer to:

Jacob B. Jackson
Jacob Jackson Farm
Jacob Jackson (soccer)